Kware is a slum neighbourhood in Embakasi in the city of Nairobi. It borders the Mukuru slums and Initially Kware was predominantly an informal settlement but over the years part Kware and Pipeline have earned a reputation for their poor infrastructure, coupled with overcrowded flats, narrow streets, littering, as well as its poor drainage system.

Overview
Kware, a mispronounced version of 'quarry', got its name from a nearby quarry site. It borders the Mukuru and Pipeline slums. Electorally, Kware is placed under Embakasi South Constituency; the whole constituency is within the Embakasi Sub-county. Kware is also an electoral ward within the constituency.

As of 2019, Kware together with Pipeline have a population of 166,517, with 87,056 of them being male and 79,439 being female. The neighbourhood has a population density of 106,445/km2 in a land area of 1.6km2, the highest after Huruma.

References 

Populated places in Nairobi Province
Suburbs of Nairobi